Vennesla Church is a parish church of the Church of Norway in Vennesla Municipality in Agder county, Norway. It is located in the village of Vennesla. It is the church for the Vennesla parish which is part of the Otredal prosti (deanery) in the Diocese of Agder og Telemark. The church is also the seat of the provost of the Otredal prosti. The white, stone church was built in a long church design in 1830 using plans drawn up by an unknown architect. The church seats about 240 people.

History
The earliest existing historical records of the church date back to the year 1620, but the church was pretty old at that time. At that time, the church had 2 bells which were described as "almost useless" plus several very old pieces of furniture in the building. In 1638, a new, small, wooden church was built on the same site. By the 1820s, the church was too small and in need of expansion or replacement. After many issues arising from the new location, type of materials to use, lack of money, difficulty in transporting materials, and issues with the workers, construction began in 1829 on a site just east of the old church. The new stone church was consecrated on 22 August 1830. Afterwards, the old church was torn down (the old church site was between the present church and the current road). The main nave and choir were made of stone and the entry and tower on the west and sacristy in the east were constructed out of wood. In 1886, the tower was reconstructed and heightened (although this was a controversial change).

In 2018, work on planning for a new Vennesla Church began. Construction began in 2019 on a site immediately to the east of the old church. It is expected that the new church will be completed in the spring of 2022.

See also
List of churches in Agder og Telemark

References

Vennesla
Churches in Agder
Stone churches in Norway
19th-century Church of Norway church buildings
Churches completed in 1830